Boarding School Juliet is an anime series adapted from the manga of the same title by Yōsuke Kaneda. The series is directed by Seiki Takuno at Liden Films, with Takao Yoshioka written the scripts, Yūki Morimoto designed the characters and Masaru Yokoyama composed the music. The series aired from October 6 to December 22, 2018, during the Animeism programming block on MBS, TBS, BS-TBS. The series was streamed on Amazon Prime Video in Japan and markets other than China. The series' opening theme titled "Love With You" is performed by fripSide, and the ending theme titled  is performed by Riho Iida. The series ran for 12 episodes.


Episode list

Notes

References

Boarding School Juliet